Kanausi lies in the Kesari Khera Ward of Lucknow Municipal Corporation. The ward's councilor lives in Kanausi. It was previously a village.

References

Neighbourhoods in Lucknow